Abdul Rashid Shaheen is an active politician, socialist and a philanthropist He is born on August 3rd 1945)  He has served as minister for industries back is 1980s and member of parliament two times from baramulla constituency in 1990s. He was a member of the 14th Lok Sabha of India. He used to  represent the Baramulla (Lok Sabha constituency)constituency of Jammu and Kashmir and was a member of the Jammu and Kashmir National Conference (JKNC) political party.

External links
 Official biographical sketch in Parliament of India website
 

Living people
1945 births
India MPs 2004–2009
India MPs 1999–2004
Jammu & Kashmir National Conference politicians
People from Baramulla
Lok Sabha members from Jammu and Kashmir